Subedar Major Satish Kumar (born 4 May 1989) is an Indian amateur boxer and a junior commissioned officer (JCO) of the Indian Army. He won the bronze medal at the 2014 Asian Games at Incheon in the super heavyweight category and silver at the 2018 Commonwealth Games. He is the first Indian boxer to qualify for the Olympics in the super heavyweight category.

Early life
Born to a farmer in Bulandshahr who had four sons, Satish Kumar wanted to join the army like his elder brother did. He did so in 2008 as a Sepoy and moved to Ranikhet, where he was spotted for his height during a boxing camp and was urged to give the sport a try.

Awards 
He was awarded the Arjuna Award by the Government of India in 2018.

References

External links
 
 Profile at incheon2014.kr

1989 births
Living people
Indian male boxers
Asian Games medalists in boxing
Asian Games bronze medalists for India
Boxers at the 2014 Asian Games
Medalists at the 2014 Asian Games
Boxers at the 2020 Summer Olympics
Olympic boxers of India
Commonwealth Games medallists in boxing
Commonwealth Games silver medallists for India
Boxers at the 2018 Commonwealth Games
Boxers from Uttar Pradesh
People from Bulandshahr
Super-heavyweight boxers
Recipients of the Arjuna Award
Medallists at the 2018 Commonwealth Games